Group C of UEFA Euro 2004 was one of four groups in the final tournament's initial group stage. It began on 14 June and was completed on 22 June. The group consisted of Italy, Denmark, Sweden and Bulgaria.

Sweden won the group and advanced to the quarter-finals, along with Denmark. Italy and Bulgaria failed to advance.

Three teams – Italy, Denmark and Sweden – all finished with five points, with each team having defeated Bulgaria but drawn their two other games. As all results between the three teams in question were draws, both the points won in these games and the goal difference accrued in these games still left the teams undivided. The decisive tiebreaker was therefore the goals scored during the games between one another: Italy having scored the fewest goals of the three teams were therefore eliminated.

This became so with a 2–2 result between Denmark and Sweden in the last group game, a result that Italy knew would eliminate them and one that representatives of both teams denied would happen in advance of the game, Sweden co-coach Lars Lagerbäck quoted as saying in response to Italian questions on the likelihood of this score occurring: "I don't think it will end 2–2 — that is a very unusual result".

Teams

Notes

Standings

In the quarter-finals,
The winner of Group C, Sweden, advanced to play the runner-up of Group D, Netherlands.
The runner-up of Group C, Denmark, advanced to play the winner of Group D, Czech Republic.

Matches

Denmark vs Italy

Sweden vs Bulgaria

Bulgaria vs Denmark

Italy vs Sweden

Italy vs Bulgaria

Denmark vs Sweden

See also
Denmark–Sweden football rivalry

References

External links
UEFA Euro 2004 Group C

Group C
Sweden at UEFA Euro 2004
Group
Group
Bulgaria at UEFA Euro 2004
Denmark–Sweden football rivalry